Washington Place (William Washington House) is one of the first homes built by freed slaves after the Emancipation Proclamation of 1863 in Hampshire County, West Virginia, United States. Washington Place was built by William and Annie Washington in north Romney between 1863 and 1874 on land given to Annie by her former owner, Susan Blue Parsons of Wappocomo plantation.  William Washington later acquired other properties on the hills north of Romney along West Virginia Route 28 and became the first African-American land developer in the state of West Virginia. One of his subdivisions is the "Blacks Hill" neighborhood of Romney, adjacent to the Washington Place homestead. Washington Place was bought and restored by Ralph W. Haines, a local attorney and historic preservationist.

Image gallery

See also
List of historic sites in Hampshire County, West Virginia

External links

African-American history of West Virginia
Farms in West Virginia
Houses completed in 1874
Houses in Hampshire County, West Virginia
Buildings and structures in Romney, West Virginia
Vernacular architecture in West Virginia